Nuclear may refer to:

Physics
Relating to the nucleus of the atom:
Nuclear engineering
Nuclear physics
Nuclear power
Nuclear reactor
Nuclear weapon
Nuclear medicine
Radiation therapy
Nuclear warfare

Mathematics
Nuclear space
Nuclear operator
Nuclear congruence
Nuclear C*-algebra

Biology
Relating to the nucleus of the cell:

 Nuclear DNA

Society
Nuclear family, a family consisting of a pair of adults and their children

Music
"Nuclear" (band), group music.
"Nuclear" (Ryan Adams song), 2002
"Nuclear", a song by Mike Oldfield from his Man on the Rocks album
Nu.Clear (EP) by South Korean girl group CLC

Films
Nuclear (film), a 2022 documentary by Oliver Stone.

See also
Nucleus (disambiguation)
Nucleolus
Nucleation
Nucleic acid
Nucular